Isakovka is a rural locality (a village) in Chishminsky Selsoviet, Chishminsky District, Bashkortostan, Russia. The population was 8 as of 2010. There are 3 streets.

Geography 
Isakovka is located 15 km south of Chishmy (the district's administrative centre) by road. Kuchumovo is the nearest rural locality.

References 

Rural localities in Chishminsky District